Black Sails at Midnight is the second studio album by Scottish heavy metal band Alestorm. As with their first album, all the drums tracks were recorded by session drummer Migo Wagner but touring drummer Ian Wilson added additional percussion. The album features string and brass arrangements and folk instruments as opposed to the more heavy metal instrumentation of Captain Morgan's Revenge. The special edition of the album included a live DVD of the band's performance at the 2008 Wacken Festival.

Track listing

Song information
"No Quarter" was previously a demo recording by Battleheart, Alestorm's name before signing with Napalm Records.  The signing with Napalm necessitated a name change to avoid confusion with Battlelore. A part of the song contains Alestorm's rendition of the Pirates of the Caribbean theme. "Wolves of the Sea" and "Leviathan" are re-recorded tracks which previously appeared on the Leviathan EP. "P is for Pirate" is a comedy a capella track based on the Sesame Street song C Is For Cookie that is only available on the iTunes version of the album. It features the band singing about how much they love being pirates and their belief that pirates are much better than ninjas.

On 27 March 2009, a split album titled "Black Sails Over Europe" was released on Napalm Records, which features "That Famous Ol' Spiced", "Keelhauled", and "Wolves of the Sea", alongside recordings by Týr and Heidevolk. It was limited to 1000 copies.

On 26 June 2009, a video was released for the song "Keelhauled". Alestorm's first music video. The beginning of the video depicts Christopher Bowes standing up in front of the rest of the crew urging them to allow guitarist Dani Evans to be keelhauled, following a theft. He is promptly keelhauled in a rather realistic manner. As he is keelhauled scenes of the band drinking, gambling and engaging in sexual activity aboard the pirate ship are shown.

Release history

Personnel
 Christopher Bowes - vocals, keyboards, tin whistle
 Ian Wilson - percussion, vibraslap, backing vocals
 Dani Evans - bass, guitars, backing vocals

Additional personnel and staff
 Justus Twele - bagpipes
 Bee Bloodpunch - backing vocals
 Heinrich Gimpel - bass trombone
 Carsten Petersen - trumpet, cornet
 Tobias Hain - trumpet
 Mirjam Beyer - violin
 Lasse Lammert - guitars, backing vocals, producer, mixing, recording
 Tim Shaw - backing vocals
 Brendan Casey - backing vocals
 Migo Wagner - drums
 James Murphy - mastering
 Gordon Krei - brass arrangements
 Ingo Römling - cover art

Bonus DVD - Live at Wacken 2008
Intro (Bowes)
Over the Seas (Bowes)
The Huntmaster (Bowes)
Death Before the Mast (Bowes/Harper/McQuade)
Nancy the Tavern Wench (Bowes)
Set Sail and Conquer (Bowes/Harper)
Wenches and Mead (Bowes)
Captain Morgan's Revenge (Bowes)

Wacken 2008 line-up
Christopher Bowes - Lead Vocals; Keyboards
Gavin Harper - Lead Guitars; Backing Vocals
Dani Evans - Bass Guitars; Backing Vocals
Alex Tabisz - Drums

Charts

References

External links

2009 albums
Alestorm albums
Napalm Records albums